There Once Was a Husband (Spanish: Había una vez un marido) is a 1953 Mexican musical comedy film directed by Fernando Méndez and starring Lilia Michel, Rafael Baledón and Pedro Infante.

Cast

References

Bibliography 
 María Luisa Amador. Cartelera cinematográfica, 1950-1959. UNAM, 1985.

External links 
 

1953 films
1953 musical comedy films
Mexican musical comedy films
1950s Spanish-language films
Films directed by Fernando Méndez
Mexican black-and-white films
1950s Mexican films